Pandori or Pindori may refer to:

Places

Punjab, India
 Pandori, Bhulath, village in Kapurthala district
 Pandori, Jalandhar, village in Jalandhar district
 Pandori Khas, village in Jalandhar district
 Pandori (Ludhiana West), village in Ludhiana district
 Pandori Musharkati, village in Jalandhar district
 Pandori, Phagwara, village in Kapurthala district
 Pandori Sheikhan, village in Jalandhar district
 Pandori Jagir, village in Jalandhar district
 Pandori Jagir, Sultanpur Lodhi, village in Kapurthala district
 Dhak Pandori, village in Kapurthala district
 Pindori Rajputan, village in Jalandhar district

Punjab, Pakistan
 Pandori, Jhelum, a village in Punjab, Pakistan
 Pindori Kalan, a village in Wazirabad Tehsil, Gujranwala District
 Pindori Khurd, a village in Wazirabad Tehsil, Gujranwala District
 Chowk Pindori, a village in Kallar Syedan Tehsil, Rawalpindi District

People
Kulwant Singh Pandori (born 1973), Indian politician
Ratan Pandoravi (1907–1990), Indian Urdu poet